The Complete Yusef Lateef is an album by multi-instrumentalist Yusef Lateef recorded in 1967 and released on the Atlantic label.

Reception

The Allmusic reviewer Thom Jurek stated: "The title of this album is misleading in that it may suggest to the casual viewer a retrospective. It is anything but. Lateef is referring here to the complete in the sense that it contains the completeness of his musical vision at a given time... an album that is as fine as any of his Prestige or Impulse! recordings".

Track listing 
All compositions by Yusef Lateef, except as indicated
 "Rosalie" (Traditional) - 5:28
 "In the Evening" (Leroy Carr, Don Raye) - 6:41
 "Kongsberg" - 6:12
 "Stay With Me [Theme from the Cardinal]" (Carolyn Leigh, Jerome Moross) - 5:21
 "Sea Line Woman" (Traditional) - 6:24
 "Brother" - 4:57
 "You're Somewhere Thinking of Me" - 3:23

Personnel 
Yusef Lateef - alto saxophone, tenor saxophone, flute,  (track 4)  oboe, vocals
Hugh Lawson - piano
Cecil McBee - bass
Roy Brooks - drums
Sylvia Shemwell - tambourine (tracks 1 & 5)

References 

Yusef Lateef albums
1968 albums
Albums produced by Joel Dorn
Atlantic Records albums